This is a list of fellows of the Royal Society elected in its ninth year, 1668.

Fellows 
Thomas Allen (d. 1684)
Arthur Annesley (1614–1686)
James Arderne (1636–1691)
Sir John Banks (1627–1699)
Edward Brown (1644–1708)
Edward Chamberlayne (1616–1703)
Thomas Colepeper (1637–1708)
John Colwall (1664–1679)
Edward Conway (1623–1683)
Peter Courthope (1655–1685)
Antonio Alvares da Cunha (1626–1690)
Sir Maurice Eustace (d. 1703)
Daniel Finch (1647–1730)
Thomas Flatman (1637–1688)
(unknown) Flower (b. 1668)
James Gregorie (1638–1675)
Erasmus Harby (1628–1674)
Charles Hotham (1615–1674)
Edward Howard (1668–1706)
William Le Hunt (1668–1682)
John Locke (1632–1704)
Sir Kingsmill Lucy (1649–1678)
Esay Ward (1629–1674)
William Wentworth (1626–1695)
Benjamin Woodroffe (1638–1711)

References

1668
1668 in science
1668 in England